The Macon Steel was a professional indoor football team based in Macon, Georgia. The team played most of the 2012 season as a member of American Indoor Football. The Steel played its home games at the Macon Coliseum.

The Macon Steel folded on May 6, 2012, due to financial difficulties. At the time, then-Steel head coach Ervin Bryson announced he was going to form a new American Indoor Football team for Macon called the Macon Irons to start play in 2013, but the team never came to fruition.

The Steel was the second arena/indoor football team to be based in Macon, following the af2's Macon Knights, which played from 2001 until 2006. Macon would not get another indoor football team until the Georgia Doom began play in 2018.

Season-by-season

|-
|2012 || 1 || 5 || 0 || T-5th ||

Regular season

References

External links
 Macon Irons Facebook page
 American Indoor Football official Website

American football teams in Georgia (U.S. state)
Former American Indoor Football teams
Sports in Macon, Georgia
American football teams established in 2012
American football teams disestablished in 2012
2012 establishments in Georgia (U.S. state)
2012 disestablishments in Georgia (U.S. state)